Vicki Keith Munro, CM, O.Ont (born 26 February 1961 in Winnipeg, Manitoba) is a Canadian retired marathon swimmer.

She currently holds 16 world records and has received over 41 honours and awards, having crossed many of the world's most challenging bodies of water. To date, she has raised over $1 million CAD to help children with physical disabilities. Retired from marathon swimming since 1991, Keith continues to raise awareness and funds for programs and projects to help children with physical disabilities and makes public appearances as an inspirational speaker.

She came out of retirement to attempt a new world record on 5 August 2005. Her goal was to swim   from Oswego, New York to Kingston, Ontario. However, her attempt was cut short due to high waves. Just before leaving the water, she was averaging only one kilometre an hour because of waves more than two metres tall. If Keith had continued, the wind and waves would have added 30 more hours to her expected 48-hour swim.

Two weeks after her unsuccessful attempt, Keith was back in the water. This time the route was a shoreline swim when she travelled from Point Petre in Prince Edward County to Long Point, then diagonally to the north shore of Amherst Island, along Amherst Island to Griffin Point, across to Fairfield Park and then along the shore to Lake Ontario Park. She completed , setting a new world record for distance butterfly. The swim, originally predicted to take 48 hours, took 63 hours and 40 minutes (over 2½ days). She had to fight high winds and waves, strong currents, cold temperatures and hallucinations to accomplish her goal.

Swimming achievements
 First crossing of all five Great Lakes (completed in a two-month period)
 First double crossing of Lake Ontario
 First butterfly swim across the English Channel
 Longest solo swim (distance) 
 Longest solo swim (time) 63 hours 40 minutes
 129 hours, 45 minutes continuous swimming (pool record)
 Greatest distance, butterfly (male or female) 
 Most crossings of Lake Ontario (six)
 Circumnavigation of Sydney Harbour (butterfly)
 Crossing of the Juan de Fuca Strait in British Columbia (butterfly)
 Crossing of Lake Ontario (butterfly)
 Crossing of Catalina Channel (butterfly)

Awards and honours
The end of the Leslie Street Spit in Toronto has been named Vicki Keith Point in her honour. This is where she made most of her landings after crossing Lake Ontario.

Keith was inducted into the Terry Fox Hall of Fame in 1996 and the Ontario Sports Hall of Fame in 2005.

See also
 Harbor Beach Light

References

External links
 
 
 Page about Vicki Keith at Solo Swims

1961 births
Living people
Canadian female long-distance swimmers
Canadian humanitarians
Women humanitarians
Members of the Order of Canada
Members of the Order of Ontario
Swimmers from Winnipeg
English Channel swimmers
Canadian Disability Hall of Fame